Shreve is an unincorporated community in Stoddard County, in the U.S. state of Missouri.

The community name is taken from that of one Mr. Shreve, proprietor of a local sawmill.

References

Unincorporated communities in Stoddard County, Missouri
Unincorporated communities in Missouri